A Capitolium (Latin) was an ancient Roman temple dedicated to the Capitoline Triad of gods Jupiter, Juno and Minerva. A capitolium was built on a prominent area in many cities in Italy and the Roman provinces, particularly during the Augustan and Julio-Claudian periods. Most had a triple cella, one for each god.

The earliest known example outside of Italy was at Emporion (now Empúries, Spain).

Examples of capitolia are:

 Capitolium Vetus (Rome)
 Temple of Jupiter (Pompeii)
 Capitolium of Minturnae
 Capitolium of Ostia Antica
 Capitolium of Brixia (Brescia)
 Capitoline Temple at Volubilis
 Capitolium of Cosa

References 

 
Jupiter (mythology)
Minerva
Ancient Roman architecture